Tampere–Pirkkala Airport, or simply Tampere Airport, is located in Pirkkala, Finland,  south-west of Tampere city centre. The airport is the 14th-busiest airport in Finland, as measured by the total number of passengers (8,391 in 2021), and the eighth-busiest as measured by the number of international passengers (7,979 in 2021).

The airport is also home to the Satakunta Air Command base of the Finnish Air Force. F-18 Hornets were stationed at Tampere-Pirkkala airport until the middle of 2014 when the 21st flight of the Satakunta Air command was dissolved.

History 

At that time the airport was connected to Helsinki, Vaasa, Oulu and Kemi by Aero O/Y (now Finnair). The first terminal building was built in 1941. Karhumäki Airways began to fly to Stockholm in the 1950s. The runway was paved in 1958. Between 1936 and 1979 Härmälä airport served 1.5 million passengers. In 1979, Härmälä airport was closed and the new Tampere–Pirkkala Airport was opened.

The current terminal 1 building was completed in 1996. Ryanair started flights to Tampere–Pirkkala in April 2003. Its first destinations were Stockholm-Skavsta, London-Stansted, Frankfurt-Hahn and Riga. This made the airport one of Finland's fastest-growing airports and increased its annual passenger numbers from 256,380 to 709,356 between 2000 and 2008. In 2011, Ryanair had 13 destinations from Tampere–Pirkkala. Wizz Air flew to Gdańsk during summers 2010 and 2011. airBaltic resumed flights to Riga in March 2017.

The low-cost airline terminal 2 was renovated in 2014–2015. However, in April 2015, Ryanair announced that it would cancel all the routes from Tampere for the winter season 2015–16 due to a plane shortage. Then, only routes to Bremen and Budapest resumed in spring 2016. As of 2022, Ryanair only offers flight to London-Stansted.

On 14 December 2021, AirBaltic announced that its first secondary hub outside of the Baltic countries will be founded in Tampere Airport in May 2022.

Airlines and destinations 
The following airlines operate regular scheduled and charter flights at Tampere–Pirkkala Airport:

Statistics

Passengers

Freight and mail

Ground transportation 

The airport is connected to the city centre of Tampere (25 minutes) by bus route 103, which runs a few times a day just after planes land.
The bus fare for a single ticket to Tampere is €5.50 (zones A+B+C).
One can change to any other bus, tram or commuter train going anywhere within Tampere and parts of neighbouring municipalities within 90 minutes from the purchase of the ticket.

Bus route 39A goes to central Pirkkala, where one can transfer to a number of buses that go to Tampere or Nokia.

There are long-distance connections to Helsinki and other cities via the Tampere Bus Station. The timetables and fares can be found at the Matkahuolto web site.

A taxi service is also available in front of Terminal 1.

See also 

List of the busiest airports in the Nordic countries

References

External links 

 Finavia – Tampere–Pirkkala Airport (official site)
 AIP Finland – Tampere–Pirkkala Airport
 
 

Airports in Finland
Airport
Airport
Buildings and structures in Pirkanmaa
Finnish Air Force bases
International airports in Finland